Dušan Škvarenina (16 October 1939 – 16 September 1997) was a Slovak cyclist. He competed in the tandem event at the 1960 Summer Olympics.

References

External links
 

1939 births
1997 deaths
Slovak male cyclists
Czechoslovak male cyclists
Olympic cyclists of Czechoslovakia
Cyclists at the 1960 Summer Olympics
People from Krompachy
Sportspeople from the Košice Region